Mark Tooley (born 1965) is an American Methodist layman and writer. He is a lifelong member of the United Methodist Church, who became president of the Washington-D.C. based Institute on Religion and Democracy (IRD), in 2009, an ecumenical religious think tank that makes Christian arguments for democracy, human rights and religious freedom.

Life
Tooley is a graduate of Georgetown University. He has worked for IRD since 1994, prior to which he worked for the CIA. His articles have appeared in Wall Street Journal, World, National Review and elsewhere.  He is editor of Providence: A Journal of Christianity and American Foreign Policy, which espouses Christian Realism.

He is the author of Taking Back the United Methodist Church. Tooley was featured in the October 10, 2009 issue of World magazine.

In November 2009, Tooley signed an ecumenical statement known as the Manhattan Declaration calling on Evangelicals, Catholics and Orthodox not to comply with rules and laws permitting abortion, same-sex marriage and other matters that go against their religious consciences.

Tooley authored Methodism & Politics in the 20th Century: From William McKinley to 9-11 (2011), the first comprehensive overview of the political witness of what was once America's largest Protestant denomination.

In 2015 Tooley's book, The Peace That Almost Was: The Forgotten Story of the 1861 Washington Peace Conference and the Final Attempt to Avert the Civil War was published by Thomas Nelson/Harper Collins.

Tooley has contributed chapters to The New Christian Zionism: Fresh Perspectives on Israel and the Land, Race and Covenant:  Recovering the Religious Roots for American Reconciliation, The Next Methodism: Theological, Social, and Missional Foundations for Global Methodism, and Just War and Christian Traditions.

Works
Methodism and Politics in the 20th Century from William McKinley to 9/11, Bristol House, 2011, 
 
Three Weeks Till Hell Breaks Loose, Harpercollins Christian Pub, 2015,

References 

1965 births
Living people
American male writers
American United Methodists
Methodist writers